"The Perfect Crime #2" is a song on the American indie rock band The Decemberists' fourth album, The Crane Wife. The song is a sequel to "The Perfect Crime #1", a song which did not appear on The Crane Wife and was later released as a bonus track.

"The Perfect Crime #2" was released as a single in September 2007, the second single released from The Crane Wife (following "O Valencia!"). This was the first time The Decemberists have released more than one single from an album.

Track listing
Digital Download/12" Single (US)
 "The Perfect Crime #2 (A Touch of Class Robs the Bank Remix)"
 "The Perfect Crime #2 (Diplo's Doing Time Remix)"
 "The Perfect Crime #2 (Junior Boys Remix)"
 "The Perfect Crime #2 (The Perfect Crime #2.5.1)"

Chart positions

References

The Decemberists songs
2007 songs
Songs written by Colin Meloy